Yellowknife Water Aerodrome  is an aerodrome adjacent to the "old town" section of Yellowknife, Northwest Territories, Canada on both Back Bay and East Bay of Great Slave Lake. It is open from the middle of June until October and may be used by ski equipped aircraft in the winter.

Airlines and Destinations

Passenger

See also
Air Tindi
Yellowknife Airport

References

Registered aerodromes in the North Slave Region
Transport in Yellowknife
Seaplane bases in the Northwest Territories